( – ) was a Japanese politician, businessman, and leader of the Burakumin liberation movement. Born in Fukuoka Prefecture, Matsumoto led the Burakumin liberation movement during its activity, earning himself the title "Father of the Buraku Liberation" from the Buraku Liberation League.

Career
Matsumoto was born in Chikushi District, now part of the city of Fukuoka. His parents were Burakumin. After graduating from Sumiyoshi Elementary School and Kanjō Junior High School in Tokyo, he dropped out of Dalian High School in 1900. During 1907, Matsumoto made his living as a street fortune-teller and quack doctor. In 1910, he was extradited back to his home province by the consul general. By 1911, Matsumoto had established the Matsumoto Company, which specialized in civil engineering and heavy construction. The company was later destroyed by members of the Kyūshū Yakuza Clan. In 1921, the Chikuzenkyō revolutionary group was organized. That same year, during the celebration of the 300th anniversary of the first Fukuoka daimyō Kuroda Nagamasa, the protest movement organized by Matsumoto rose up and the celebration turned into "voluntary donation from non-discriminated descendants against forms of discrimination" under enforcement.

Having strong ideas about equality between people throughout Japan, Matsumoto organized the resistance of not giving the title of nobility  to Iesato Tokugawa. Later, after the assassination of Iesato Tokugawa, Matsumoto was found guilty of attempted assassination, and was imprisoned for four months in 1927. In 1926, Matsumoto lead an impeachment campaign against the Fukuoka Regiment Discrimination. In 1929, he was imprisoned for a second time, this time for three years and six months, without any clear reason. Many suspect the impeachment campaign as the reason. In 1936, Matsumoto became a member of the House of Representatives.

This was a governmental camouflage, because Ichirō Hatoyama in fact didn't write any recommendations. This election was an excuse to get rid of Matsumoto's public offices. The same year he was elected as vice-chairman of the House of Councilors. He was known among the people as a leftist leader. Matsumoto is well known for saying about himself, "I became a chairman despite my burakumin origins. Socialists hold the majority in the House of Representatives and in the House of Councilors, and in order for Komakichi Matsuoka to win, they've chosen me."

In 1948, being a vice-chairman of the House of Councilors, Matsumoto made a refusal to the Emperor's audience in the case known as "The Sideways Scuttle of a Crab". After that his public offices were banished, but this was cancelled in 1951. Until his death in 1966, Matsumoto continued his buraku liberation activities.

Inconsistencies

"Quack doctor" question

During Matsumoto's stay in Dalien, he worked as a quack doctor under the title of "first class army surgeon of Great Japan". In the book Matsumoto Jiichirō's Biography, the following was written: "[those] abandoned by modern medical care were welcomed", and there are recordings that "If Matsumoto was critical of the aggression of Japanese imperialists towards China, he wouldn't have proclaimed himself the 'first class army surgeon of Great Japan'"; some criticisms of his activities are cited: "Matsumoto earned, for a living, getting cash for the 'treatment' of Chinese people. Faulty 'treatment' quite frequently resulted in the loss of one's life. Matsumoto did this fraud and swindling in China, but he never did it in Japan". Although Matsumoto said in the next years: "I cannot do percussion and auscultation, but even now I have great self-confidence in visual examination".

War collaboration question
In 1942, when Matsumoto had won a nomination to Taisei Yokusankai, his campaign bulletin had the following greetings: "Streams of blood for the Country!", "Overthrow America in the fight 'til death, destroy the Anglo-Saxon domination of the world; in unity of hundreds in one nation, the young and the aged united in gunfire, despite hardship, leading to invincible victory!"

On 14 June 1943, Matsumoto was one of the organizers of an imperialist group called the "Eight Days Committee". Seigō Nakano and Bin Akao were both present at the inaugural meeting when an "inspirational speech" took place. The creeds of "Eight Days Committee" were used during the early beginnings of the Pacific War: "Let our every action show the real meaning of the national polity!", "Let's fight remembering our Emperor has a faith we will win!", etc. Though Matsumoto did everything he could to support Japan's war efforts, including budget agreements, after the defeat he suddenly shifted to the side of opposition and rejected militarism. He said, "I've always been fighting for equality, revealing anti-war movements and creeds. I had always known about the defeat", and "I have always had anti-war ideals", as well as, "I am for anti-militarism and democracy".

In January 1953, in Yangon, Burma, at the welcoming citizens' mass meeting, Matsumoto delivered a speech as a representative of the (leftist) Social Democratic Party. He said "Japan is now a rapidly developing and economically growing country, but on the other hand, it came at the peril of imperial fascism. Japan sacrificed many countries to that end, which seduced us like the Devil. Of course, our socialists were against these wars", ..." — this statement by Matsumoto, alludes that he probably lied about his war collaboration.

Bronze statue
Fukuoka Prefecture, Buraku Liberation Center (Fukuoka city)

Family
Ryu Matsumoto, his grandson and former Democratic Party of Japan politician and member of the House of Representatives of Japan.

Quotations
"Neither violence nor target."
"Where there is nobility, there are serfs." (Also explained as "In order to make Gods of men, men are made into beasts" in the same script)
"No drinking. No smoking. No gambling. No wife, no buying girls. No necktie." (These principles Matsumoto maintained all his life)
"Fighting with authority, what do I think about? If the Emperor hadn't conferred a decoration on me, my resistance movement probably wouldn't have existed. Being decorated conveys authority. This thought exists while buraku discrimination exists."
"My enemy is not you. My enemy is the one standing behind your back. But if you feel yourself soul-searching what you have done, I forgive you."

References

Further reading

松本治一郎「部落解放への三十年」（近代思想社）1948年
部落解放同盟中央本部編「松本治一郎伝」（解放出版社）1987年
金静美「水平運動史研究―民族差別批判」（現代企画室）1994年
福岡県人権研究所・松本治一郎プロジェクト編「松本治一郎」（西日本新聞社）2003年
高山文彦 (作家)|高山文彦「水平記 松本治一郎と部落解放運動の一〇〇年」（新潮社）2005年
水平同志会編「伝記松本治一郎」（水平同志会）2006年

1887 births
1966 deaths
Burakumin
People from Fukuoka
Japanese human rights activists